Silvano Fashion Group is an Estonian company which focuses on designing, manufacturing and saling of ladies lingerie.

In total, the company has six lingerie, beachwear and underwear brands: Milavitsa, Lauma Lingerie, Alisee, Avelin and Laumelle for ladies and Hidalgo underwear for men. The company has shops in 23 different countries.

The company is established in 1944.

Since 1997, the company is listed in Nasdaq Tallinn, at the beginning (since 1997) in I-List and since 2006, in Main List.

In 2011, AS PTA Grupp started bankruptcy proceedings.

Since about 2020, the company has over 2000 employees in five countries.

References

External links
 

Companies of Estonia